The 23rd Air Base is a Polish Air Force base, located 6 km east of Mińsk Mazowiecki. It was officially constituted on 1 January 2001, replacing the disbanded 1st Aviation Regiment "Warszawa".  The main unit based there is the 1st Air Tactical Squadron flying MiG-29 fighters.

On 18 December 2017, one of the MiG-29's stationed here crash landed in a forest near Kałuszyn while performing a landing approach. The pilot survived.  Reports afterward were contradictory whether he ejected or not. On 21 December 2017, the MoD confirmed that the pilot did not eject. This was the first crash of a MiG-29 during its nearly 3 decades long operational history in the Polish Air Force.
The second crash followed on 4 March 2019. This time the pilot ejected and survived.

References

External links
 Official webpage

Airports in Poland
Polish Air Force bases
Mińsk County
Buildings and structures in Masovian Voivodeship